Carolina, North Carolina may refer to:
 Carolina, Alamance County, North Carolina
 Carolina, Gaston County, North Carolina

See also 
 Carolina (disambiguation)